Top Spin is a 2014 feature-length documentary film directed by Mina T. Son and Sara Newens. It follows the road to the 2012 Summer Olympics of three American table tennis teenager players: Ariel Hsing, Michael Landers, and Lily Zhang.

Top Spin has been premiered at the 2014 DOC NYC. The documentary has won the Audience Award and was nominated for Best Documentary at the 2015 CAAMFest. It also won awarded for Best Editing and was nominated for the Best Documentary Feature at the 2015 Los Angeles Asian Pacific Film Festival. Top Spin was also nominated for the Documentary Competition at the 2015 Nashville Film Festival.

It has a 100% rating, with an average score of 7/10 based on 9 reviews, on Rotten Tomatoes. It has a rating of 81 on Metacritic, stating "Universal acclaim based on 5 critics".

References

External links 

2014 films
2014 documentary films
Documentary films about the Olympics
Documentary films about sportspeople
Table tennis at the 2012 Summer Olympics
Table tennis films
Films about the 2012 Summer Olympics
2010s English-language films